The Swiss Trade Union Federation (SGB; ; , USS) is the largest national trade union center in Switzerland.

History
The federation was founded in 1880 and represents 361,000 members in its affiliated unions (2015).

The SGB has close ties with the Social Democratic Party of Switzerland (SPS). Ruth Dreifuss, the former President of the Confederation, and former member of the Swiss Federal Council, was previously an SGB official.

Affiliates

Current affiliates
The following unions are affiliated to the SGB:

Former affiliates

Presidents
Since 1884, the SGB has had the following 27 presidents, one of which was a woman:
1884: Ludwig Witt
1886: Johann Kappes
1886: Ludwig Witt
1888: Albert Spiess
1888: Georg Preiss
1890: Rudolf Morf
1891: Conrad Conzett
1893: Eduard Hungerbühler
1894: Eduard Keel
1896: Lienhard Boksberger
1898: Alois Kessler
1900: Heinrich Schnetzler
1902: Niklaus Bill
1903: Karl Zingg
1909: Emile Ryser
1912: Oskar Schneeberger
1934: Robert Bratschi
1954: Arthur Steiner
1958: Hermann Leuenberger
1969: Ernst Wüthrich
1973: Ezio Canonica
1978: Richard Müller
1982: Fritz Reimann
1990: Walter Renschler
1994: Christiane Brunner and Vasco Pedrina
1998: Paul Rechsteiner
2019: Pierre-Yves Maillard

References

External links 

 

Trade unions in Switzerland
International Trade Union Confederation
European Trade Union Confederation
Trade Union Advisory Committee to the OECD
1880 establishments in Switzerland
Organisations based in Bern
Trade unions established in 1880
Swiss Climate Alliance